Piper J. Drake (born September 15, 1976, in New York State) is a Thai American author and podcast personality. She has also written as PJ Schnyder.

Early life 
She studied at Trenton State College and graduated with a Bachelor of Science in Biology. She began a career in life sciences and graduated from Temple University with a Master of Science in Quality Assurance/Regulatory Affairs.

Career 
Piper J. Drake (or "PJ") began her writing career in 2010 as "PJ Schnyder" writing award-winning science fiction & paranormal romance and steampunk.

Her first podcast credit came from narrating her own short story written as PJ Schnyder, A Swan in Siam, for Tales from the Archives Vol. 2 set in the world of The Ministry of Peculiar Occurrences created by Tee Morris and Philippa Ballantine. She has provided her voice to episodes of The Voice of Free Planet X by Jared Axelrod. She appears as a guest on The Shared Desk by Tee Morris and Philippa Ballantine occasionally and is co-host of MangoRicePod with her partner, Matthew J. Drake.

In 2015, she began writing romantic suspense as Piper J. Drake. She debuted in the genre with the Safeguard series, published by Carina Press. Her True Heroes series, published by Hachette Book Group's Grand Central Publishing's Forever imprint, launched in 2016.

In 2017, Drake joined the cast of Writing Excuses as a host for season 12. She also launched 20 Minute Delay, a podcast on travel co-hosted with Gail Carriger.

Recognized by the Romance Writers of America in 2018 as a Romance Trailblazer, having written the first Own Voices Thai (Southeast Asian) romance.

Surprise guest with TypecastRPG on Twitch in July 2020, she joined the cast in 2021.

Publications

Novels 
Heart's Sentinel written as PJ Schnyder, Carina Press, 2010, 
Fighting Kat written as PJ Schnyder, Carina Press, 2014, ASIN: B00F942UCI
Hidden Impact, Carina Press, 2015,      
Extreme Honor, Forever – Hachette Book Group, 2016,      
Deadly Testimony, Carina Press, 2016,      
Ultimate Courage, Forever – Hachette Book Group, 2016,      
Absolute Trust, Forever – Hachette Book Group, 2016, 
Contracted Defense, Carina Press, 2017, 
Total Bravery, Hachette Book Group, 2018, 
Fierce Justice, Hachette Book Group, 2019, 
Forever Strong, Hachette Book Group, 2020,

Novellas 
Red's Wolf written as PJ Schnyder, Decadent Publishing, 2010, 
Evie's Gift written as PJ Schnyder, Decadent Publishing, 2010, 
Hunting Kat written as PJ Schnyder, Carina Press, 2011, ASIN: B005078OME
Bite Me written as PJ Schnyder, Carina Press, 2011, ASIN: B005078OME
Sing for the Dead written as PJ Schnyder, Carina Press, 2011, ASIN: B005078OME
Survive to Dawn written as PJ Schnyder, Carina Press, 2011, ASIN: B005078OME
Siren's Calling (The Sea King's Daughters Book 4), 2018, ASIN: B07FWSWV5T
Gaming Grace (Gone Wild Book 2), 2020, ASIN: B081155LZ1

Short stories
A Swan in Siam written as PJ Schnyder, Tales from the Archives, 2013
Winter Valor, True Heroes short story in 2016
A Calamity of Crows written as PJ Schnyder, Tales from the Archives, releasing in 2017

Awards and recognition
 2014 Prism Award from Futuristic, Fantasy and Paranormal Chapter of the RWA for Sing for the Dead written as PJ Schnyder
 2013 Golden Leaf Award from New Jersey Romance Writers for Bite Me written as PJ Schnyder
 2013 Parsec Award winner for Best Speculative Fiction: Small Cast (Short Form)

References

1976 births
Living people
21st-century American novelists
21st-century American women writers
American romantic fiction writers
American science fiction writers
American women novelists
American women short story writers
American paranormal romance writers
Steampunk writers
Women romantic fiction writers
Women science fiction and fantasy writers
21st-century American short story writers